Western Creek is a locality in the Toowoomba Region, Queensland, Australia.

Geography 
The creek of the same name rises in the east of the locality and flows west through the locality into neighbouring locality of Weir River where it becomes a tributary of the river of the same name.

Most of Western Creek is within the Western Creek State Forest with only a few small areas of farmland and undeveloped land in the northern, eastern and southern parts of the locality.

History 

The locality takes its name from the parish, which in turn was named after an early pastoral run Western Creek belonging to James Laidley during the 1840s. In 1849 it was taken over by Captain Frances Durrell Vignoles in 1849, who held it for about thirty years, but problems with grass seed and his sheep ruined him financially. It was taken over in 1883 by The Scottish Australian Investment Company Limited and then by Dalmally Limited in association with W.A. Russell. Following Russell's death, it was taken over by Albert Edward Specht of Wellcamp, the son of pioneering family on the Darling Downs. When Specht died in 1941, the property was taken over by his two brothers William Dougall Specht and Archibald John Specht. After Archibald's death in 1944, William continued to run the property until his death in 1952. The property was then purchased by Thomas Barkla son of J.E.E Barkla who had purchased adjacent Dunmore station in 1916. 

The property originally carried over 100,000 head of sheep in addition to cattle and horses, but resumptions of land over the years reduced its capacity.

References 

Toowoomba Region
Localities in Queensland